Touhid Tareq (born 17 January 1995) is a Bangladeshi cricketer who plays for Rajshahi Division. He made his List A debut for Shinepukur Cricket Club in the 2017–18 Dhaka Premier Division Cricket League on 9 February 2018. He made his Twenty20 debut for Gazi Group Cricketers in the 2018–19 Dhaka Premier Division Twenty20 Cricket League on 26 February 2019.

See also
 List of Rajshahi Division cricketers

References

External links
 

1995 births
Living people
Bangladeshi cricketers
Gazi Group cricketers
Rajshahi Division cricketers
Shinepukur Cricket Club cricketers
Place of birth missing (living people)